Hősök tere, lit. Heroes' Square, is one of the major squares in Budapest, Hungary, noted for its iconic Millennium Monument with statues featuring the Seven chieftains of the Magyars and other important Hungarian national leaders, as well as the Memorial Stone of Heroes, often erroneously referred as the Tomb of the Unknown Soldier. The square lies at the outbound end of Andrássy Avenue next to City Park (Városliget). It hosts the Museum of Fine Arts and the Palace of Art (Műcsarnok). The square has played an important part in contemporary Hungarian history and has been a host to many political events, such as the reburial of Imre Nagy in 1989. Most sculptures were made by sculptor György Zala from Lendava, with one made by György Vastagh.

In Budapest there are three more squares named Hősök tere, 'Heroes' Square', in the districts or neighbourhoods of Soroksár, Békásmegyer and Rákosliget.

History and outlook

Hősök tere is surrounded by two important buildings, Museum of Fine Arts on the left and Palace of Art (or more accurately Hall of Art) on the right. On the other side it faces Andrássy Avenue which has two buildings looking at the square – one is residential and the other one is the embassy of Serbia (former Yugoslavian embassy where Imre Nagy secured sanctuary in 1956).

The central feature of Heroes' Square, as well as a landmark of Budapest, is the Millennium Memorial (also translated Millennium Monument or Millennial Monument). Construction began in 1896 to commemorate the thousandth anniversary of the Hungarian conquest of the Carpathian Basin and the foundation of the Hungarian state in 896, and was part of a much larger construction project which also included the expansion and refurbishing of Andrássy Avenue and the construction of the first metro line in Budapest. Construction was mostly completed in 1900, which was when the square received its name. The four allegoric sculptures were added in 1906, the monument as a whole basically looked like it does today (except for the kings' statues), complete with the surrounding museums on either side, and it was inaugurated still in the same year, 1906.

When the monument was originally constructed, Hungary was a part of the Austro-Hungarian Empire and thus the last five spaces for statues on the left of the colonnade were reserved for members of the ruling Habsburg dynasty. From left to right these were Ferdinand I (relief: Defense of the Castle at Eger); Leopold I (relief: Eugene of Savoy defeats the Turks at Zenta), Charles III, Maria Theresa (relief: The Hungarian Diet votes support for Maria Therese with their vow "vitam et sanguinem" at Pressburg on 11 September 1741) and Franz Joseph (relief: Franz Joseph crowned by Gyula Andrássy). The monument was damaged in World War II and when it was rebuilt the Habsburgs were replaced by the current figures.

On 16 June 1989 a crowd of 250,000 gathered at the square for the historic reburial of Imre Nagy, who had been executed in June 1958.

At the front of the monument is the Memorial Stone of Heroes (Hősök emlékköve), a large stone cenotaph surrounded by an ornamental iron chain. The cenotaph is dedicated "To the memory of the heroes who gave their lives for the freedom of our people and our national independence."  While some guide books refer to this as a tomb it is not a burial place but is erroneously referred as the "Tomb of the Unknown Soldier". Hungary has no Tomb of the Unknown Soldier unlike most European countries, nor any memorial to the unknown fallen of wars. No human remnants are interred here, there is only an artesian well under the tombstone-like memorial. The Memorial Stone of Heroes was originally erected in 1929 as a tribute to those who died defending Hungary's 1000-year-old borders. It was removed in 1951 as its message was politically unacceptable for the Communist regime. The current one was built at the same spot in 1956. The memorial is surrounded by a fence and it is off limits for visitors. The Ministry of Defence only opens the gate for foreign dignitaries and official state ceremonies.

Behind the cenotaph but within the decorative chain is a flat bronze plate which marks the site of an artesian well whose drilling was completed in 1878 by Vilmos Zsigmondy. This well provides water for the Széchenyi thermal bath behind the monument and the Dagály Baths in the Népfürdő utca. The well reached a depth of 971 meters and produces 831 liters of hot water per minute at 74 degrees Celsius.

The Heroes' Square monument has a 90% duplicate in Shanghai Global Paradise, Shanghai. Since its opening in 1996, it has been mostly degraded and most statues removed.

Millennium Monument
The back of the monument consists of two matched colonnades, each with seven statues representing great figures of Hungarian history.

This is a list of the statesmen portrayed in the semi-circular arcades, with the topic of the relief below each figure given below the name.

Statues of the column

Directly behind the cenotaph is a column topped by a statue of the archangel Gabriel. In his right hand the angel holds the Holy Crown of St. Stephen (Istvan), the first king of Hungary. In his left hand the angel holds a two-barred apostolic cross, a symbol awarded to St. Stephen by the Pope in recognition of his efforts to convert Hungary to Christianity. In Hungarian it is referred to as the double cross or the apostolic double cross.

At the base of the column is a group of seven mounted figures representing the Magyar chieftains who led the Hungarian people into the Carpathian basin. In the front is Árpád, considered to be the founder of the Hungarian nation. Behind him are the chieftains Előd, Ond, Kond, Tas, Huba, and Töhötöm (Tétény). Little survives in the historical record about these individuals and both their costumes and their horses are considered to be more fanciful than historically accurate.

Statues of the left colonnade
Topping the outer (left) edge of the left colonnade is a statue of a man with a scythe and a woman sowing seed, representing Labour and Wealth. At the inner  (right) end of the left colonnade, is a male figure driving a chariot using a snake as a whip and representing War. For the initial five statues of Habsburg emperors and the corresponding reliefs, see above in the history paragraph.

Statues of the right colonnade
At the inner (right) end of the right colonnade is a female figure in a chariot holding a palm frond representing Peace. At the outer (left) end of the right colonnade is a double statue of a man holding a small golden statue and a woman with a palm frond, representing Knowledge and Glory.

Gallery

Millennium Monument

Buildings around the square

References
 Hajós, György, Heroes' Square, Municipality of Budapest (2001)
 Gerő, András, Heroes' Square Budapest, Corvina (1990)

External links

Hősök tere underground station

Squares in Budapest
World Heritage Sites in Hungary
Monuments and memorials in Hungary
Colonnades
Landmarks in Hungary
Victory monuments
Heroes